Little Secret is a Brazilian drama film directed by David Schurmann. The film was inspired by a true story involving Schurmann's adopted sister. It was released in Brazil in November 2016. It was selected as the Brazilian entry for the Best Foreign Language Film at the 89th Academy Awards but it was not nominated.

Cast
 Marcello Antony as Vilfredo Schurmann
 Júlia Lemmertz as Heloisa Schurmann
 Mariana Goulart as Kat Schurmann
 Maria Flor as Jeanne
 Erroll Shand as Robert
 Fionnula Flanagan as Bárbara

Reception and Controversies
A number of controversies were raised over the film, including the nonselection of Aquarius (film) as the Brazilian's entry to the Best Foreign Language Film at the 89th Academy Awards by the Ministry of Culture’s committee.

Critic Alcino Leite Neto, writing for Folha de S.Paulo, heavily criticized the film, calling it "one of the worst of the recent Brazilian films" and "an ocean of clichés and sentimentality".

Conversely, critic Luciano Trigo, writing for G1, praised the film saying that "Little Secret is indeed the best Brazilian film in the last few years. In style, form and content, it is fully accredited to compete and win the Oscar for Best Foreign Film".

See also
 List of submissions to the 89th Academy Awards for Best Foreign Language Film
 List of Brazilian submissions for the Academy Award for Best Foreign Language Film

References

External links
 

2016 films
Brazilian drama films
Films scored by Antônio Pinto